São Miguel do Couto is a former civil parish in the municipality of Santo Tirso, Portugal. In 2013, the parish merged into the new parish Santo Tirso, Couto (Santa Cristina e São Miguel) e Burgães. It is located southeast in the city of Santo Tirso, near the bottom of Monte Cordova Hill.

At the 2001 census, it had a population of 1,292. It covers 2.39 km² of area, most of which is residential although there are some textile industry facilities here, too.

In 907, Count Hermenegildo González, governor of the Condado Portucalense, was born here.

References

Former parishes of Santo Tirso